Jonathan or Jonathon Hill may refer to:
Jonathan Hill (architect) (born 1958), English architect
Jonathan Hill, Baron Hill of Oareford (born 1960), British politician
Jonathan Hill (baseball), baseball player in the Negro leagues
Jonathan Hill (cricketer) (born 1990), Filipino-Australian cricketer
Jonathan Hill (presenter), Welsh television presenter
Jonathan Hill (theologian) (born 1976), English theologian
Jonathan N. C. Hill, British academic
Jonathon D. Hill (born 1985), American politician
Jonny Hill (rugby union) (Jonathan Paul Hill, born 1994), English professional rugby union player

See also 
Jon Hill (disambiguation)
John Hill (disambiguation)
Hill (surname)